The following highways are numbered 327:

Canada
 Manitoba Provincial Road 327
 Nova Scotia Route 327
 Quebec Route 327

China
 China National Highway 327

Costa Rica
 National Route 327

India
 National Highway 327 (India)

Japan
 Japan National Route 327

United States
  Arkansas Highway 327
  Florida State Road 327
  Georgia State Route 327
  Indiana State Road 327
  Iowa Highway 327 (former)
  Kentucky Route 327
  Louisiana Highway 327
  Maryland Route 327
  Montana Secondary Route 327
  New Mexico State Road 327
 New York:
  New York State Route 327
  County Route 327 (Erie County, New York)
  Ohio State Route 327
  Pennsylvania Route 327 (former)
  Puerto Rico Highway 327
  South Carolina Highway 327
  Tennessee State Route 327
 Texas:
  Texas State Highway 327
  Texas State Highway Spur 327
  Farm to Market Road 327
  Virginia State Route 327